Kindbergia is a genus of mosses belonging to the family Brachytheciaceae.

The genus was first described by Ryszard Ochyra in 1982.

The genus name of Kindbergia is in honour of Nils Conrad Kindberg (1832-1910), who was a Swedish bryologist.

Description
Species in the genus are mat forming and grow to a medium to large size. Leaves are borne on creeping stems, and are regularly pinnate. 

The genus has cosmopolitan distribution.

Species
Species adapted from The Plant List;

Kindbergia africana 
Kindbergia altaica 
Kindbergia arbuscula 
Kindbergia brittoniae 
Kindbergia dumosa 
Kindbergia kenyae 
Kindbergia oedogonium 
Kindbergia oregana 
Kindbergia praelonga 
Kindbergia squarrifolia

References

Hypnales
Moss genera